Eduardo (Edward) Santos (born October 1, 1979) is a former Filipino professional darts player. Who would have represented the Philippines as an International Qualifier to the 2014 Ladbrokes 
World Darts Championship. However, he has had to withdraw from the tournament due to travel problems, and was replaced by Colin Osborne, the highest-ranking non-qualified player on the PDC Order of Merit.

References 

1979 births
Living people
Filipino darts players